James Monahan may refer to:

 James G. Monahan (1855–1923), U.S. Representative from Wisconsin
 James Henry Monahan (1803–1878), Irish judge

See also
 Erwin James (Erwin James Monahan, born 1957), British prisoner and journalist